Mahogany Avenue, also known as the Mahogany Road and J. P. Rizal Street, is a   secondary road in Tagaytay, Philippines. It acts as an alternative route for the Tagaytay–Nasugbu Highway.

The entire road is designated as National Route 413 (N413) of the Philippine highway network.

The road is known for being the location of Mahogany Beef Market, which is famous for its bulalo.

Intersections

References

External links 
 Department of Public Works and Highways

Roads in Cavite